Ryan Colburn (born November 8, 1986) is a former American football quarterback. He was signed by the New Orleans Saints as an undrafted free agent in 2011. He played college football at Fresno State. Ryan attended high school at Central Valley Christian where he led his team to Valley Championships under Mark Gambini.

Professional career
Colburn was signed by the New Orleans Saints as an undrafted free agent following the end of the NFL lockout in 2011. He was cut by the Saints one week later. He was then signed by the Sacramento Mountain Lions. Colburn started the first game of the 2011 season for the Mountain Lions.

External links
 Fresno State Bulldogs bio
 Just Sports Stats

1986 births
Living people
American football quarterbacks
Fresno State Bulldogs football players
New Orleans Saints players
Sacramento Mountain Lions players
Spokane Shock players